Gol Abbas (also Romanized as Gol ‘Abbās and Gol-e ‘Abbās; also known as Qeshlāq Gol-e ‘Abbās) is a village in Asgariyeh Rural District, in the Central District of Pishva County, Tehran Province, Iran. At the 2006 census, its population was 1,383, in 313 families.

References 

Populated places in Pishva County